Helmut Bornefeld (14 December 1906 – 11 February 1990) was a German Protestant church musician, composer, and writer.

Career 
Born in Untertürkheim, Bornefeld began his vocational training in 1922 with an apprenticeship as gardener, which he completed with the skilled worker examination. From 1924 to 1928 he studied music at the Adler Conservatory in Stuttgart. In 1928 he moved to the Musikhochschule (today Staatliche Hochschule für Musik und Darstellende Kunst Stuttgart), where he studied composition with Ewald Straesser, piano and organ with Hermann Keller. From 1935 to 1937 he completed his education by studying church music, which he completed with the A-exam. In 1951 he was appointed Kirchenmusikdirektor there.

Together with Siegfried Reda, Bornefeld organized the Heidenheimer Arbeitstage für Neue Kirchenmusik from 1946 to 1960. From 1937 to 1977 he was also an organ keeper with more than a hundred new buildings and renovations, many of them with his own draft brochures. Under his influence, numerous organs worthy of protection were - partly irrevocably - changed in character according to his ideas. By sawing off pipes, among other things, he endeavoured to brighten the sound of mainly Romantic or late Romantic organs and to reshape the dispositions according to his aesthetic ideals.

Bornefeld has written numerous texts and essays on questions of church music and organ building.

Bornefeld died in Heidenheim an der Brenz on 11 February 1990 aged 85.

Awards 
Bornefeld was awarded the Bundesverdienstkreuz for his achievements in 1972. On 5 June 1976 Land Minister Hans Filbinger awarded him the honorary professorship of the state of Baden-Württemberg and thus the title of professor.
On December 4, 1981, he received the Citizen Medal of the City of Heidenheim. In 1993, the name of the local Kirchenstraße was changed in Helmut-Bornefeld-Straße.

Organ brochures and organ dispositions (selection) 

As an organ keeper, Bornefeld designed numerous instruments with an eye to outer appearance, casing and mensuration. His musical aesthetic concerns are still evident today in many instruments, of which a selection of thirty have been listed in the area of the Protestant Church in Württemberg:

 Evangelische Michaelskirche in Heidenheim an der Brenz.
 Evangelische 
 Evangelische Stadtkirche in Schorndorf
 Evangelische Kirche in Schrozberg, built by Gebrüder Link, Giengen
 Chororgel (1960) in Ulmer Münster
 Evangelische Kirche in Wachbach by Bad Mergentheim
 , built by Gebrüder Link, Giengen

Works (selection)

Organ, choir and chamber music 
 1930–1960: Choralwork with numerous choir and accompanying movements, organ choral movements, choral preludes, motets, cantatas, partitas and sonatas
 Arrangements of secular folk songs
 Spiritual and secular canons
 Music for solo singing or/and solo instruments with organ
 Works for organ solo
 Chamber music
 Numerous arrangements of the works of other composers from different eras for different instrumentations

Hymnbooks 
The Evangelisches Gesangbuch contains canons by Bornefeld:
 EG 173 Der Herr behüte deinen Ausgang und Eingang (1947) (Stammteil)
 EG 633 Trachtet nach dem, was droben ist (1947) (Regionalteil Bayern)
 EG 683 Jesus Christus gestern und heute (1947) (Regionalteil Württemberg).

Bibliography 
 
 Martin Jörg: Der Komponist Helmut Bornefeld (1906–1990) – Verzeichnis seines Nachlasses in der Württembergischen Landesbibliothek. Teil 1: Das musikalische Werk, Korrespondenz I, Schrifttum, Werkverzeichnisse, Wißner-Verlag, Augsburg 2006, .
 Martin Jörg: Der Komponist Helmut Bornefeld (1906–1990) – Verzeichnis seines Nachlasses in der Württembergischen Landesbibliothek. Part 2: Restliche Korrespondenz, Orgelakten, Bildnerischer Nachlass, Tonaufnahmen und anderes, Wißner-Verlag, Augsburg 2011, .
 Klaus Kirchberg: Bornefeld, Helmut. in Grove Music Online (subscription required).
 Klaus Kirchberg, Richard Baum: Bornefeld, Helmut. In Ludwig Finscher (editor): Die Musik in Geschichte und Gegenwart. Second edition, Personenteil, volume 3 (Bjelinski – Calzabigi). Bärenreiter/Metzler, Kassel u. a. 2000,  (in line edition, subscription required for full access)

References

External links 
 
 Werkverzeichnis (Auswahl)
 Short Biography
 Website über sein Wirken, eingerichtet zum 100. Geburtstag
 
 Organ index: Helmut Bornefeld (german)

1906 births
1990 deaths
Musicians from Stuttgart
20th-century German composers
Sacred music composers
German classical organists
German choral conductors
Recipients of the Cross of the Order of Merit of the Federal Republic of Germany